Educating Father is a 1936 American comedy film directed by James Tinling and starring Jed Prouty, Shirley Deane, and Dixie Dunbar. It was part of the Jones Family series of films.

Cast
 Jed Prouty as John Jones  
 Shirley Deane as Bonnie Jones  
 Dixie Dunbar as Millicent 
 Spring Byington as Mrs. John Jones  
 Kenneth Howell as Jack Jones  
 June Carlson as Lucy Jones  
 George Ernest as Roger Jones  
 Florence Roberts as Granny Jones  
 Billy Mahan as Bobby Jones  
 Francis Ford as Sheriff Hart  
 Charles Tannen as Jim Courtney  
 J. Anthony Hughes as Dick Harris 
 David Newell as Eddie Gordon 
 Clarence Wilson as Jess Boynton  
 Jonathan Hale as Fred Humphrey  
 Erville Alderson as Dr. Willoughby
 Dick Elliott as Townley  
 Phyllis Fraser as Girl in Drugstore  
 Selmer Jackson as Prof. Howard
 Landers Stevens as Milford

References

Bibliography
 Bernard A. Drew. Motion Picture Series and Sequels: A Reference Guide. Routledge, 2013.

External links
 

1936 films
1936 comedy films
American comedy films
Films directed by James Tinling
20th Century Fox films
American black-and-white films
Films scored by Samuel Kaylin
1930s English-language films
1930s American films